Hongtashan is a Chinese brand of cigarettes, owned and manufactured by Hongta Group, formerly known as Yuxi Cigarette Factory. The brand was founded as a gift contributing to the 10th anniversary of the Chinese Communists winning the Chinese Civil War and the proclamation of the People's Republic of China.

History
Hongtashan was launched in 1959 and gets its name from the location of its main production facility, Hongtashan Hill ('Red Pagoda Hill') in Yuxi. The cigarettes are made with a flue-cured tobacco type and therefore sugar and nicotine levels are relatively high.
Hongtashan cigarettes are mainly sold in China, though the export business is still a major operation, under the control of Indonesian businessman Ted Sioeng. In the United States, the brand is sold as 'Red Pagoda Mountain'.

In 2001, Hongtashan was ranked as the most valuable of all brands in Mainland China for the 7th consecutive year by the People's Daily, beating household appliances brand Haier.

In 2004, Hong Kong-based distributor Silver Base Sales Manager Alex Chung (left) and Marco Tse, reported that they wanted to export the Hongtashan Premium variant to European and U.S. based Duty Free airport shops after the ease of visa restrictions for Chinese abroad. Retailers from Heathrow Airport, Charles de Gaulle Airport, San Francisco International Airport and Amsterdam Airport Schiphol expressed interest in the product during the TFWA World Exhibition 2004, and they were firming up the details with Silver Base. Southeast Asian airports began selling the cigarettes from April 2004 onwards. Of these locations, Singapore Changi Airport sold the highest volume.

In 2013, The China Whisperer named Hongtashan one of the most expensive cigarettes on the Chinese market, costing 500 Chinese Yuan per carton. It was worth an estimated $3.9 billion according to the Beijing Famous Brand- Name Asset Appraisal Firm in 1995.

See also
 Chunghwa
 Smoking in China
 China National Tobacco Corp

References

Chinese cigarette brands
China Tobacco
1959 establishments in China
Products introduced in 1959